Operation Fulton Square was a joint U.S. Army and Army of the Republic of Vietnam (ARVN) military operation during the Vietnam War to engage People's Army of Vietnam (PAVN) units in the lowlands of Quảng Trị Province.

Background
On 22 October 1969 control of the 1st Brigade, 5th Infantry Division (Mechanized) passed from the 3rd Marine Division to XXIV Corps and the 1st Brigade assumed responsibility, together with the ARVN 1st Infantry Division for the defense of Quảng Trị Province as the 3rd Marine Division withdrew from South Vietnam in Operation Keystone Cardinal. On that date the 1st Brigade launched Operation Fulton Square into the PAVN base areas of the Triệu Phong, Hải Lăng, Gio Linh and Mai Linh Districts.

Operation
The Brigade's mission was to conduct reconnaissance-in-force, search and clear and rice denial operations in support of the South Vietnamese government's accelerated pacification program.

On 11 November the entire 1st Battalion, 61st Infantry Regiment, reinforced by Company D, 1st Battalion, 11th Infantry Regiment and Company A, 1st Battalion, 77th Armor Regiment, made contact with a large element of the PAVN 27th Regiment. By 13 November, the 2nd Battalion, 501st Infantry Regiment, 101st Airborne Division and the ARVN 5th Battalion, 2nd Regiment were also committed to the battle. On 15 November another ARVN battalion was committed to further exploit the situation. By 20 November 253 PAVN had been killed and the 27th Regiment was in retreat.

The troopers returned fire with unit weapons, and a short while later, helicopter gunships and a U.S. Navy Patrol Boat, River (PBR) moved to the area and engaged the PAVN in support of the ground force. The gunships received ground fire from the PAVN during the action. The PAVN eventually withdrew with unknown losses, U.S. casualties were 19 wounded.

The unit fired back with unit weapons and were supported by helicopter gunships and PBRs. At 04:10 the PAVN withdrew without having penetrated the perimeter. The bodies of 16 PAVN were found in the vicinity together with 11 individual weapons, two RPG-7 grenade launchers, two mines, 49 hand grenades and 75 pounds of plastic explosives. U.S. casualties were two wounded.

The PAVN employed small arms, automatic weapons and RPG fire. The troopers fired back with unit weapons and the PAVN withdrew with unknown losses. U.S. casualties were two killed and nine wounded.

Aftermath
PAVN losses were 384 killed. The operation was immediately followed by Operation Green River covering the same area.

References

1969 in Vietnam
1970 in Vietnam
Battles involving Vietnam
Battles and operations of the Vietnam War
Battles involving the United States
Battles and operations of the Vietnam War in 1969
Battles and operations of the Vietnam War in 1970
History of Quảng Trị province